The Hanghai Stadium (Simplified Chinese: 郑州航海体育场) is a multi-purpose stadium in Zhengzhou, Henan, China.  It is currently used mostly for football matches and athletics events.  It serves as the home stadium for Henan Jianye of the Chinese Super League.  The stadium has a capacity of 29,860 people. It opened in 2002.

External links
Stadium picture

References

Buildings and structures in Zhengzhou
Sports venues in Henan
Football venues in China
Multi-purpose stadiums in China
Henan Songshan Longmen F.C.